is a 2013 Japanese anime series based on the Battle Spirits Trading Card Game. It was produced by Sunrise and Nagoya Broadcasting Network and aired on TV Asahi from September 22, 2013, to September 21, 2014  It replaced Battle Spirits: Sword Eyes in the Nichi Asa Kids Time 7:00 timeslot, and was succeeded by Battle Spirits: Burning Soul. It has not been released outside Japan until 2019, ViuTV aired this series in Hong Kong with Cantonese dubbing.

This is the last Battle Spirits anime to be animated by Sunrise, as it is aired two years before the founding of BN Pictures.

Plot
Card Quester "Rei the Number One Star" is searching for the Ultimate Battle Spirits, a treasure somewhere in space. With him are the mini dragon Mugen, robot Salt, and the April siblings Laila and Rikuto. Rei transforms into Zero while on the battlefield, using different colors and Ultimate cards to defeat his opponents. While he heads toward the Ultimate Battle Spirits, he settles conflict around the galaxy, befriends various outlaws, and clashes with the Guild, an organization controlling space.

Characters

The protagonist. He is an almost unmatched card battler and is obsessed with the number 1. Generally easygoing, Rei tries to befriend anyone who he battles with. He eats almost nothing but pizza and Stardust Cola filled with ice, and will drink straight from the bottle when he is troubled or sad. He has a fear of ghosts, though he denies it. Rei also has an Ultimate symbol inside of him which guides him to Ultimates, but knows nothing about it. He has no memory of his past and claims to have no interest in remembering it; his earliest memory is of waking up with Ultimate-Siegfried and Ultimate-Odin in hand. After joining up with Kiriga in the Treasure Ship, a physical manifestation of his past self confronts him and forces him to accept his past. At one point, Rei traveled together with Kiriga and Miroku in the Treasure Ship, but lost his memory after sacrificing himself for Kiriga. Despite this, he wants to return to being friends with Miroku.

When playing Battle Spirits, Rei changes forms and personalities according to what color deck he uses.

 Key Cards: Ultimate-Siegfried, Ultimate-Siegfrieden, Ultimate-Siegwurm-Nova
Uses a red deck. Burning has a hot-blooded personality and easily gets fired up. Introduces himself as "The Number One heated guy in space", and his victory phrase is "The Number One Star shines bright red! There's no one stronger than me!".

 Key Cards: Ultimate-Odin, Ultimate-Siegfrieden
Uses a white deck. Silver acts much more rationally than other Zero forms and calls his spirits "my troops". Introduces himself as "The Number One sublime man in space", and his victory phrase is "The Number One Star shines white, let the victory song roar out!".

 Key Cards: Ultimate-Kingtaurus
Uses a green deck. Hurricane constantly talks about the wind and "whooshes" around the battlefield. His victory phrase is "Smooth sailing, it's a tailwind!".

 Key Cards: Ultimate-Beelzebeat
Uses a purple deck. Flash acts gentlemanly and suave in manner and drinks tea during battles. His victory phrase is "Let us meet again in a wonderful hell.".

 Key Cards: Ultimate-Alexander
Uses a blue deck. Azure talks roughly and uses "ore-sama" to refer to himself. His victory phrase is "No enemy can block the path to my boundless future!"

 Key Cards: Ultimate-Rean
Uses a yellow deck. Glint treats battles as a stage performance and speaks in broken English. His victory phrase is "That was Zero the Glint!"

 Key Cards: Ultimate-Mugendragon, Ultimate-Drian, Ultimate-Chocodra
Uses a red Tri-Dragon Deity/Ultimate Dragon based deck. Unlike other forms, Zero the Ultimate is Rei himself. However, he flashes to other Zeros, Eris, or Kiriga when playing their key cards.

 Key Cards: Ultimate-Castle-Golem, Ultimate-Grand-Woden, Ultimate-Odin, Ultimate-Sagitto-Apollodragon
A young man said to be the strongest Card Quester of the Guild. He is typically calm and collected, but shows a righteous side when dealing with criminals. He views battling as work rather than something to be enjoyed before losing to Rei. Afterwards, he becomes frenzied and gains Ultimate-Grand-Woden, and uses its power to win Rei's Ultimate-Odin. Like Rei, Kiriga has a mysterious symbol inside him and has no memory. However, he begins to regain fragments when battling against Rukinos. He is called by Ultimate-Sagitto-Apollodragon and soon after leaves the Guild to pursue his past, joined by Fairy and Samantha. He at last regains his memory as well as the Treasure Ship after defeating Dulfer. In the past he traveled with Rei and Miroku on the Treasure Ship, and is seen to frequently write poems. Kiriga has three battle forms: blue, white, and red.

Rei's mini dragon partner. He has a straightforward personality, in contrast to Rei's lax behavior, though is more arrogant. Mugen has the ability to fart at will, typically using this to punish the Triumvirate. He is a big fan of Magical Star Saki, as she resembles his childhood friend Stardra. On his homeworld, he was ostracized for rejecting a human partner. He chooses to go with Rei after being told that he is the "number one bright red" dragon. Mugen transforms into a card when Rei battles, and goes through several evolutions through the series: Mugendra, Mugendragon, Mugendragon-Nova, and Ultimate-Mugendragon.

Key Cards: Nijinoko, The KnightHero Swordius-Arthur
Laila's younger brother and a novice at Battle Spirits. Rikuto holds onto the Space Compass, given to him by his grandfather. Rikuto looks up to Rei, and after finding out his goal, asks to come with him. During Rei's battles, he sometimes launches into an explanatory segment called "Rikuto-sensei's Battle Spirits Lecture". He is a card collector and owns a number of X-Rares, though is not adept at using them.

Key Cards: Knight-Pentan
Rikuto's older sister and a Card Quester. She is a clean freak and insists on keeping the Number One Star Ship tidy. Laila admires Eris, whose father was rivals with her grandfather. She lives by "Laila's Rules" at all times, sometimes announcing them to make others follow her example. She loves Pentans and uses a Pentan deck.

Key Cards: The IronHero Saigord-Golem
The Number One Star Ship's cooking robot. Salt makes pizza exclusively, turning even the simplest dishes into pizza. He frequently rhymes and makes puns. Formerly the cook of the COWCOW, but left the ship on a journey to improve his skills. Afterwards, he took on various jobs and was left in a trash heap, where he met Rei. Like Mugen, he is a fan of Magical.

Kiriga's mini dragon partner. Like Kiriga, Ian is very calm, but has a pompous side. He acts as a servant to Kiriga, and is shown to be very caring and loyal to him. Ian transforms into a card when Kiriga battles, and goes through several evolutions through the series: Drian, Star Drian, Meteodrian, and Ultimate-Drian.

A student at Amaterasu Academy. Her late father was friends with Kiriga, which leads him to visit her from time to time. During spring break, she and Samantha go with Kiriga to investigate a hint to his memory left by her father. She and Samantha return to school before entering the fourth class of space, though briefly return through Denebola's power. She appears to have a crush on Kiriga.

A student at Amaterasu Academy and Fairy's friend. She appears to have extensive technical knowledge and frequently mentions her "ranks" in various skills, notably being a third rank in bomb-making.

 Key Cards: Ultimate-Valiero, The HolyDragonEmperor Ultimate-Saviour
A space pirate famed throughout the galaxy. She has a strong sense of justice and battles against criminals to regain stolen items, which earns her the admiration of many. Her father had a rivalry with Davil April, leading her to challenge Laila. Eris has no interest in romance, claiming that her love is the sea of space. She is called by Ultimate-Saviour and led to Chocola despite initially not having an Ultimate symbol. Later she takes Miroku's former spot as one of the main pilots of the Treasure Ship. Eris has two battle forms, yellow and red.

Eris' mini dragon partner. Chocola is hatched after Eris battles Rukinos. She refers to herself as a lady, though is rather childish. She is overly fond of chocolate and all things sweet. Chocola transforms into the spirit card Chocodra when Eris battles, later evolving into Ultimate-Chocodra.

A space pirate and Eris' subordinate.

A space pirate and Eris' subordinate. The youngest of 10 siblings.

There are about 30 other unnamed crewmembers aboard The Venus with minor speaking roles.

 Key Cards: The UltimateHeroDragon Ultimate-Yamato
The boss of the Guild. He wears a visor that covers his eyes and usually speaks through a monitor. Miroku wants the Ultimate Battle Spirits for unknown reasons and has the Guild chase after it. He claims to know all things that happen in space, including Rei's past. He holds Kiriga's memories and uses it to control him. After having Kiriga retrieve the Reverse Galaxy Documents, he summons Rukinos and later Denebola from another dimension. It is revealed that he was a former friend of Rei and Kiriga, who left them thinking that he was bringing them down. In the midst of despair, he accepted Nakes' power and his eyes became blue, purple and white on the left, and green, red, and yellow on the right. Miroku wants everything in the universe and works with Nakes to achieve this.

The  is a group within the Guild that constantly chases after The Number One Star Ship for the Space Compass. The group has to date never won a battle against Rei, despite having collectively battled him nearly 20 times. They are former theater performers from Planet ASAKUSA. They serve under Rukinos and Denebola after their respective appearances.

 Key Cards: The CharismaHero Mibrock-Braver, The IceHero Mibrock-Baragan, Noisy Raven
A short man who plays a ukulele and speaks in a singsong voice. He has a habit of saying "disappointing". He is a big fan of Magical, to the point where he and the Triumvirate once pretend to kidnap her to let her rest. Uses a white Burst deck.

 Key Cards: Slave-GaiAsura, Cape Rocker
A lanky man who speaks entirely in rap and ends his sentences with "YO". Uses a red Awaken deck.

 Key Cards: The SevenShogun Beelzebeat, The CurseHero Chaotic-Seimei, Jungle Crow Demon
A heavyset transvestite. Uses a purple Curse deck.

A branch of the Guild which is known for its cruelty. It is disbanded when Rei single-handedly defeats all of the members, but is reinstated at the end of the series with an additional member.

 Key Cards: Ultimate-Desperado
The boss of the Seven Galaxy Generals. He speaks formally, with many references to meals, and insists that he be called "Lord". He takes the handles from Planet Faucet to use them as weight stones for pickled vegetables, which he loves to eat. After losing against Rei, he relinquishes the handles. Because none of the Seven Galaxy Generals could win a battle with Rei, Basila disbands the group and sets off on a journey. Afterwards, he lovingly grows vegetables on a remote planet until Hansoro finds him and takes his deck. When Hansoro loses his memory, Basilla takes him in and makes him a member of the Eight Galaxy Generals. Uses a purple core removal deck.

 Key Cards: The EvilSacredBeast Chaos-Pegasuros, The BlackInsectDemonlord Diabolica-Mantis
Second-in-command of the Seven Galaxy Generals. First seen on Planet Ice Cube battling for the Ultimate Crystal there, and is about to claim it for the Guild before Rei shows up and takes it. When the Seven Galaxy Generals are disbanded, Zard resents Basilla, having wanted to become the new boss of the group instead. Along with the Triumvirate, he attempts to steal Rei's decks. He reappears during the Justice Cup, and appears to have reformed his ways. Uses a yellow/green rush deck.

 Key Cards: The BlackInsectDemonlord Diabolica-Mantis
One of the Seven Galaxy Generals. Almeida rules over the people of Planet Gunrock, making them dig up Crystals in the mines. The Triumvirate trick him into battling Rei, and as a result he loses control of the planet. He teams up with Goin to defeat Rei, but to no avail. Uses a green high speed deck.

 Key Cards: The SevenShogun Asmodios
One of the Seven Galaxy Generals. Goin, like Almeida, is on Planet Gunrock, and attempts to defeat Rei. After losing to Rei, he is forced to leave the planet. Uses a purple deck.

One of the Seven Galaxy Generals. Usually he serves at Basilla's side. Uses a white deck.

One of the Seven Galaxy Generals.

One of the Seven Galaxy Generals. Speaks in grunts. He is from the unnamed water planet in the Third Class.

 Key Cards: The PhantomStarDragon Gai-Asura, Ultimate-Gai-Asura
A high-ranking Guild member who works directly under Miroku. He is called "teacher" by the Triumvirate. After battling Rei and Kiriga, he becomes convinced that the Guild is going in the wrong direction and confronts Miroku. Hansoro is defeated and loses his memory. He goes on a quest to regain his memory, and is taken in by Basilla whom he had formerly defeated. Hansoro becomes the eighth member of the reformed Eight Galaxy Generals, and in the epilogue becomes the new head of the Guild.

 Key Cards: The CancerAstralArmored BraveCancer, The ShellBladeGeneral Legioss
An invader from another dimension that Miroku calls using the Reverse Galaxy Documents. Rukinos' soul possesses a crab doll, and he consumes crab excessively. He destroys the gate to the third class, though it is fixed later. He participates in the Justice Cup, but loses to Magical. He is used by Miroku to summon Nakes. Uses a green deck.

 Key Cards: The LeoAstralArmored LeoBrave, The CarrierEmperor Ridefencer
An invader from another dimension that Miroku calls using the Reverse Galaxy Documents. She is egotistical and frequently compares life to a show, of which she is the star. Looking to battle Rei, Denebola goes to the Number One Star Ship and wins against Salt instead, thus taking the Space Compass. She shows up at the Justice Cup, using a fake Compass to bait Rei into a battle. Kiriga eventually regains it after another battle, in which Denebola dramatically confesses her love for him. She is used by Miroku to summon Nakes. Uses a white deck.

 Key Cards: The SnakeEmperorAstralArmored BravePiooze, Gothic-Grave
An invader from another dimension that Miroku calls by sacrificing Rukinos and Denebola. The embodiment of Ophiuchus, sealed away on a distant planet. Nakes gave Miroku power in exchange for his revival, though swallows him after obtaining the Ultimate Battle Spirits. He wants to consume space itself to ease his loneliness, and Zero the Ultimate defeats him.

Planet Greensmothie

 Key Cards: The LightFangPhoenix Rekkuumaru
Leader of Planet Greensmoothie's forest people. Maripoza worships the God of Darkness Bomber, and kidnaps Laila as a sacrifice to him. Her faith was shaken after Rei obtained Ultimate-Kingtaurus, as she became certain that he was the true god. Uses a green deck.

 Key Cards: The BlueSkyHero Kung-Wolf
A being worshipped as a god on Planet Greensmoothie. He speaks in grunts. Bomber falls in love with Eris at first sight, and battles for her hand in marriage. However, he loses, and leaves the planet. Uses a green deck.

A small bird that acts as Bomber's interpreter.

Followers of Maripoza, dressed in outfits similar to Bomber.

Planet ASAKUSA

A rich man who employs Rei's services to protect Magical's first ribbon. However, it is discovered that he is a thief and that he stole the ribbon. Kaneari is arrested by ASAKUSA police.

Sargasso Space
Pirate Ship COWCOW
A ship that Salt formerly worked on as cook. Searching for treasure, the crew sailed into the Sargasso ship graveyard. There, they found Ultimate-Beelzebeat's crystal, but were cursed and turned into ghosts; the crew does no realize this until the Number One Star Ship comes their way, however. After Rei lays claim to Ultimate-Beelzebeat, they return to normal. They are cameos of the Japanese comedian group Cowcow. The captain  is voiced by Yoshi Yamada, and the crewmate  is voiced by Kenji Tada.

The being that caused Sargasso Space to form. Originally, Sargasso Devil was a dish-washing robot that worked for a poor professor. After accidentally dropping the professor's engagement ring down the drain, he fell to despair and started to suck up everything around him. Mugen helps him make the ring resurface with hot water after Sargasso Devil loses to Rei.

Planet Bluestone

The guardian of the shrine that houses a fan said to cure any illness. He tests those who want to obtain it with a Battle Spirits quiz, turning those who fail to answer correctly into stone.

The guardian of the Shrine of Chaos which houses Ultimate-Alexander. Appears as a ball of light.

Mirror images of Zero that Rei faces off simultaneously as a trial to obtain Ultimate-Alexander.

An enka singer who is more concerned with being popular and making money than putting his heart into song. He abuses the Galactic Law of Battle Spirits to make people buy his CDs when they lose. He tries to obtain Ultimate-Rean so that he can become stronger and force people to buy more.

Found on Planet Ice Cube by Rei. Acknowledges Rei for aiming for number one.

Found on Planet Greensmoothie by Rei. Has a very belligerent and impatient personality.

Found in Sargasso Space by Kiriga. Rejects everyone who tries to obtain him, though acknowledges Kiriga for being persistent.

Found in Sargasso Space by Rei. Turns the crew of the COWCOW into ghosts, but acknowledges Rei after he beats both Yoshi and Tada.

Found on Planet Bluestone's Shrine of Chaos by Rei. He was left there by his former master for reasons unknown, and as such refuses to accept Rei as his new master. Rei convinces Ultimate-Alexander to come with him and seek out his master. On Planet Kachidonia, he meets his former master, revealed to be Kiriga. However, Kiriga has no memory of him, and Ultimate-Alexander acknowledges Rei as his new master. Later he is traded back to Kiriga in exchange for Ultimate-Odin.

Found on an unexplored planet by Rei. Shows illusions to people trying to find him, and acknowledges Rei for not running away.

One of the Tri-Dragon Deities that protects the Ultimate Battle Spirits. Fought against the dimensional invaders in the past and comes into Rei's possession with their second coming.

One of the Tri-Dragon Deities, found by Kiriga in the Six Color Nebula. He is initially dubious as to whether Kiriga will be sufficiently powerful enough without his memories, but comes into his possession anyway.

One of the Tri-Dragon Deities, found by Eris in a newly-formed nebula. Acknowledges Eris for her devotion to space and sense of justice, and grants her an Ultimate symbol.

 Key Cards: The WhiteSnakeEmperor Aldius-Viper
The number one idol in space. Her call and response phrases are "Everyone, are we friends??", followed by "Yes! Magical!". On Planet ASAKUSA, Magical is kidnapped by the Triumvirate so that she can rest. However, Mugen challenges them, not knowing their good intentions, and returns her stolen first ribbon. In the Third Class, she hosts an expedition with the crew of the Number One Star Ship on the planet where Ultimate-Rean is lying. Magical becomes enamored of Zero the Glint after seeing his first battle. She also appears at the Justice Cup as both an announcer and a participant.

A galactic charisma and host of the Justice Cup. His call and response phrases are "This is my~", followed by "Justice!!".

Guardian of the Ultimate Shrine Void, where the Ultimate Battle Spirits is housed. He is swallowed by Nakes, though is seen alive at the end.

 Key Cards: The MachineLionDeity Strikewurm-Leo
A friend of Rei and prince of Planet Faucet. Tohno has a kappa-like head, and his emotions go berserk when it is broken. The Seven Galaxy Generals challenge him for one of the handles that controls the water flow, and he loses. He goes to planet Ice Cube to get an Ultimate to take back the handle, where he meets Rei again. Tohno is also a fan of Magical Star Saki.

 Key Cards: The DarkDragon Dark-Tyrannosaura
Battles Rei for a crystal in the first episode and loses. Later, he meets Rei again in a Second Class card station, now considering him a friend. Uses a red dark deck.

Laila and Rikuto's grandfather who made the space compass. He was a card quester who searched for the Ultimate Battle Spirits, but never found it. David was rivals with Eris' father.

 Key Cards: The ArcAngelia Raraphael
Fairy's deceased father and Kiriga's friend. He is a fan of Magical and uses an Angelia-based deck. A hologram of him guards the Treasure Ship as well as Kiriga's memories.

Media

Anime
Battle Spirits: Saikyo Ginga Ultimate Zero aired on TV Asahi beginning September 22, 2013 and ending September 20, 2014. It replaced Battle Spirits: Sword Eyes in the 7:00 NichiAsa timeslot.

Music
Opening themes
 "I Wish"
 Lyrics/Composition: Ogawa Yuya
 Arrangement/Performance: BACKDRAFT SMITHS
 Episodes: 1-25, 49 (ending theme)
 "ZERO"
 Lyrics: Kotoko
 Composition: Noriyuki Asakura
 Arrangement: Yasutaka Kume
 Performance: Tatsuyuki Kobayashi
 Episodes: 26-49

Ending themes
 "Nostalgia"
 Lyrics: Niho Karasawa
 Composition/Arrangement: Yusuke Katō
 Performance: Kato*Fuku (Emiri Katō & Kaori Fukuhara)
 Episodes: 1-26
 
 Lyrics: ACKO
 Composition/Arrangement: Rui Nagai
 Performance: i☆Ris
 Episodes: 26-37
 Endless NOVA
 Lyrics: Aki Hata
 Composition/Arrangement: Seima Iwahashi
 Performance: AG7 (Shuhei Kita, Himeka, Sayaka Sasaki, Marina Kawano, Konomi Suzuki, Natsumi Okamoto, Tatsuyuki Kobayashi)
 Episodes: 38-48

Manga
A manga version by Masato Ichishiki was serialized in Saikyo Jump magazine beginning in October 2013. The chapter titles are written entirely in English words. Each chapter is referred to as a "Turn."

References

External links
Official Battle Spirits Trading Card Game site 
Sunrise's Battle Spirits: Saikyou Ginga Ultimate Zero site 
Nagoya Broadcasting Network's Battle Spirits: Saikyou Ginga Ultimate Zero site 

2013 anime television series debuts
2013 manga
Bandai Namco franchises
Card games in anime and manga
Manga series
Shōnen manga
Sunrise (company)
TV Asahi original programming
Works about card games